Chikkanayakanahalli is a town (taluk headquarters) in Tiptur sub-division of Tumakuru district, in the state of Karnataka, India.  It is 30 km away from Tiptur and 132 km from Bangalore.

Geography
It has an average elevation of 804 metres (2,637 feet).
It is located on National Highway-150A.

Demographics
As of 2001 India census, Chikkanayakana-halli had a population of 22,360. Males constitute 50.067% of the population and females 49.933%. Chikkanayakana-halli has an average literacy rate of 70%, higher than the national average of 59.5%; with male literacy of 76% and female literacy of 64%. 11% of the population is under 6 years of age.

See also 
 Akkanahalli, Tumkur
 Ajjenahalli, Chiknayakanhalli
 Tumkur
 Tumkur District
 Taluks of Karnataka
 Hagalavadi
 Kenkere
 Huliyar

References

Cities and towns in Tumkur district